The Colonel Luis Irrazábal Barboza was born in Encarnación, in Itapúa Department, Paraguay, on August 8, 1891, and died on March 16, 1958, in Asunción, capital of Paraguay.

He went to elementary school in Encarnación and to high school in Asunción.

Beginnings

On April 1, 1913, at the age of 22, he joined the National Army and from the first moment he remained true to his duty, forces from which Irrazábal was part of.

Career

In the peace that followed after the revolution, Irrazábal was sent to continue his studies in Chile. He came back to the country with a gold medal, the first one given to a foreign officer.

Later, he was sent to the garrison in Paraguarí, where he dedicated to the creation of the cavalry regiment  No. 1 “Valois Rivarola”. On February 10, 1926, he was designated to command it.

He was also, the creator of the equitation school and he worried for the intellectual and technical formation of his subordinates.

He also created the Polo club in Paraguarí and the festivities in the near cities were famous with the shows of cavalry he directed.

A short story

Being Commandant of the 3rd Branch of the Army, the Colonel Luis Irrazábal was, according to the Coronel Alfredo Ramos, a subaltern in the Chaco War, “one of this people who was born to be leader”.

“The command obeyed with convincement of the superiority of moral or intellect, searching with it the conscientious subordination, is the kind of power that is rarely found”. Much has been said about the Colonel Luis Irrazábal. It is known of his severity and his efforts to be true to his calling of service to his country, as well as his characteristic as a true friend and comrade of the men at his command. It is  proverbial the effort he put into caring for his subordinates, being them officers or members of the troop, to make the bearable the hard conditions in the front of the battle.
Those characteristics were respected and valued by his subalterns.

Difficult times

In 1928, his unit was sent to cover the area of Bahía Negra when the tension with Bolivia was about to unleash war between the two countries.

Coronel Irrazábal was sent to Belgium in a mission to prosecute the studies of Estado Mayor when the things were calmer, thanks to diplomatic help until July 31, 1932, the day that Bolivian forces took over Fortín Boquerón, which became a casus belli for Paraguay.

On September, 1932, back in Asuncion, he was appointed Commanding Officer of the forces that operated in the area of Fortín Nanawa; two months later, he was appointed Commanding Officer of the DI 5, a unit that was organizing when the Bolivians decided to attack this sector.

The first battle of Nanawa

On January 20, 1933, started the battle of Nanawa, during the first days of the frontal offensive on the Paraguayan stronghold the Bolivian army suffered more than 2.000 deaths, against the 248 Paraguayan deaths

The ways of access to Nanawa were filled with bodies but General Hans Kundt, who was in charge of the Bolivian forces ordered to continue the assault.

Surrounded by the enemy, without possibility to receive help by land, the Colonel Luis Irrazábal ordered the construction of a landing runway, which made possible the audacious maneuvers of the Paraguayan pilots, which risked to land and take off in the middle of the fire, to transport ammunitions and weaponry to the besieged soldiers, who counted with only 5 cartridges for each one. The order of Irrazábal was clear: “Once we ran out of ammunitions we will engage in one on one combat, but we will not retreat from Fortín Nanawa”.

He was awarded “Cruz del Chaco” for his successful conduct of the battle.

Second Nanawa

The commander of the Bolivian forces, the German Hans Kundt, wanted to revenge the failure of January, 1933 and prepared another attack, on July 4, he ordered the biggest frontal attack of the war. The Bolivians caved a tunnel and put on an extreme a powerful bomb, near the focal point of the Paraguayan resistance, the bomb exploded at 9:00 and give signal to the massive attack: 7.000 Bolivians, with air force included and 30 artillery pieces, tanks and flamethrowers. But by doing this, he sent his men in the line of defense of the Paraguayan and the result was a massacre. The lack of coordination of the Bolivians made them victims of their own artillery.

The Commanding Officer Irrazábal, appointed Commander of the 3rd Branch of the Army, had to face an army much bigger in number and technically superior, resisting 3 days of combat. The following days were bloody and difficult. The 3rd Branch of the Army confronted an unstoppable offensive of the Bolivians.

Emiliano R. Fernández compose music in which he sang to Commanders Irrazábal and Brizuela, to honor them for the good job they did during the battle in Fortín Nanawa, and all the difficult combats they had to engage in the Chaco.

Dismissal

The triumphs of the Paraguayan army resulted in the promotion of Estigarribia to the position of Commander in Chief of the Army. Irrazábal came to resent this. He said to Estigarribia: “You keep going, being promoted, General, we will continue, in our positions in combat, so you could keep winning medals”. This phrase cost him his job & position in the army.

After the war he was appointed Military Attaché in Buenos Aires, later in Santiago de Chile and Peru.

Luis Irrazábal, hero of Nanawa, died in Asunción, on March 16, 1958.

See also
Chaco War
First Battle of Nanawa
Second Battle of Nanawa

References

 Nueva Historia del Paraguay, Editorial Hispana Paraguay S.R.L. –Edic.1997 
 ABC color magazine 

1891 births
1958 deaths
People from Encarnación, Paraguay
Paraguayan people of Basque descent
Paraguayan Army officers
Paraguayan military personnel of the Chaco War